
EARS may refer to:

Places
 Gate of the Ears, a gate in the city of Granada (Andalusia, Spain)
 East African Rift System

Brands, enterprises, and organizations
 EARS (software) or Election Agents Record System, software which is used in connection with elections
 Electronic Arts, Redwood Shores, the headquarters of video game company Electronic Arts
 Emirates Amateur Radio Society, a national non-profit organization for amateur radio enthusiasts in the United Arab Emirates
Ultimate Ears, an American custom in-ear monitor (IEM), speaker, and earphone manufacturer

Biology
Auricularia auricula-judae, a fungus also known as "Jew's Ears" or "Judas's Ear"
Venus's ears, gastropod molluscs in the family Haliotidae, also known as abalone, ear shells, or sea ears;

See also
Bunny ears (disambiguation)
 Ear (disambiguation)
 Ears, multiple form for the sense organ that detects sound
Lend Me Your Ears (disambiguation)
Rabbit Ears (disambiguation)